Stari Dvor is a small settlement in the Municipality of Radeče in eastern Slovenia. The municipality is now included in the Lower Sava Statistical Region; until January 2014 it was part of the Savinja Statistical Region. The area is part of the traditional region of Lower Carniola.

References

External links
Stari Dvor at Geopedia

Populated places in the Municipality of Radeče